Faith Christian Academy (FCA) is a private K-12 Christian school in Orlando, Florida. It had 672 students enrolled (PK-12) in 2018.

History 
Faith Christian Academy was founded in 1972 as a ministry of Faith Assembly of God on its Goldenrod Campus. In 2012, along with Faith Assembly, FCA moved to its new, state of the art Curry Ford campus which has allowed significant growth since then due to the new and larger facility.

In 2013, a 12-year-old African American student at the school complained to staff of having been bullied by her white classmates for having afro-textured hair. Rather than addressing the bullying, she was met with a threat of expulsion by school officials, who said her afro violated the school's dress code. The school's official handbook made mention of inappropriate hairstyles in the grooming codes, but none relating to afro textured hair. Administrators asked her to cut or straighten her hair, but she refused, stating, "This is the hair that God gave me and I will not be afraid to show it". After the incident received media attention, the school neither expelled her, nor took action on the bullying allegations.

Athletics 
Faith Christian Academy is a part of the Florida High School Athletic Association.

Girls' sports
 Basketball 
 Softball
 Track and field
 Volleyball
 Weightlifting

Boys' sports
 Baseball
 Basketball 
 Football
 Soccer
 Track and field
 Weightlifting
 Golf (no longer offered as of 2008)

Notes

Christian schools in Florida
High schools in Orange County, Florida
Schools in Orange County, Florida
Private schools in Florida
Educational institutions established in 1972
1972 establishments in Florida